In Mandaeism, a shganda (šganda) or ashganda (ašganda) is a ritual assistant who helps priests with ritual duties.

Tarmida initiations
Tarmida initiates or novices (šualia) have often been trained as shgandas when they were children. Initiates may or may not be married, although typically they are not yet married.

During tarmida initiation ceremonies, shgandas, who represent emissaries from the World of Light, also help perform the rituals, many of which are held in a specially constructed priest initiation hut (škinta) and also a nearby temporary reed hut (andiruna).

See also
Acolyte
Altar server

References

Mandaeism
Mandaic words and phrases
Mandaean rituals
Mandaean titles
Religious occupations